Arendt–Seymour House is ad historic building in Canal Winchester, Ohio. It was listed in the National Register of Historic Places in 1989.  It is considered an example of Railroad Era architecture and features Italianate details.

References 

Houses on the National Register of Historic Places in Ohio
Houses in Franklin County, Ohio
National Register of Historic Places in Franklin County, Ohio